Héber Pena Picos (born 16 January 1990) is a Spanish footballer who plays as either a left winger or a forward.

Club career
Pena was born in Ferrol, Galicia, and joined Racing de Ferrol's youth setup in 2007, from SD O Val. He made his senior debut during the 2009–10 season, while on loan at Tercera División side Narón BP.

Pena returned to his parent club for the 2010–11 campaign, but featured sparingly. In 2013 he moved to fellow fourth tier side UD Somozas, helping in their promotion to Segunda División B in his first season.

Pena returned to Racing Ferrol on 20 June 2015, with his side now in the third division. He continued to appear in the category in the following years, representing Racing de Santander, Real Murcia, UD Melilla, CD Badajoz and CE Sabadell FC; with the latter, he contributed with eight appearances (play-offs included) as his side achieved promotion to Segunda División.

Pena made his professional debut on 19 September 2020 at the age of 30, starting in a 1–2 away loss against Rayo Vallecano. He scored his first professional goal the following 13 March, but in a 1–2 loss at CD Castellón.

References

External links

1990 births
Living people
Spanish footballers
Footballers from Ferrol, Spain
Association football wingers
Association football forwards
Segunda División players
Segunda División B players
Tercera División players
Racing de Ferrol footballers
UD Somozas players
Valencia CF Mestalla footballers
Racing de Santander players
Real Murcia players
UD Melilla footballers
CD Badajoz players
CE Sabadell FC footballers